Chen Yang or Yang Chen may refer to:

People surnamed Chen 
 Chen Yang (TV host) (born 1954), Chinese TV host and newspaper columnist
 Chen Yang (footballer) (born 1977), Chinese football player and manager
 Chen Yang (gymnast) (born 1987), Chinese trampolinist
 Chen Yang (discus thrower) (born 1991), Chinese discus thrower
 Chen Yang (field hockey) (born 1997), Chinese field hockey player

People surnamed Yang 
Yang Chen (footballer, born 1974), Chinese football player and manager
Yang Chen (parathlete) (born 1989), Chinese Paralympic athlete
Yang Chen (footballer, born 1989), Chinese football player
Yang Chen (footballer, born 1991), Chinese football player
Yang Chen-Ning (born 1922), Chinese theoretical physicist